Wimer is a surname. Notable people with the surname include:

John Wimer (1810–1863), American politician
Marie Wimer, American tennis player
Ross Wimer, American architect

See also
Wimer, Oregon
Wimer Bridge
James Wimer Octagonal Barn
Wimmer